The following lists are for team Football at the 1972 Summer Olympics – Men's Asian Qualifiers.

Qualifying tournaments

Group 1 

- - - - - Malaysia qualify

Group 2 
All matches are held in Rangoon, Burma.
First Round
 
Group A location Matches

Group (A)

Group (B)

Semi-finals - 1

Semi-finals - 2

Finals

BURMA qualify.

- - - -

Group 3 
This group was initially scheduled to be played at Tehran but, due to problems obtaining visas from the Iranian authorities, FIFA rescheduled the group as a series of knockout ties.

First round

Second round

Third round

Iran qualify

Qualified team for Summer Olympics
The following teams from Asia qualified for the 1972 Summer Olympics.

References

Football at the 1972 Summer Olympics
1972